XAPI may refer to:

 Experience API (Tin Can API), an e-learning software specification that allows programmatic inclusion of the learning content
 XAPI management toolstack, a Xen Cloud Platform interface for hypervisor management and configuration of virtual machines